Kendriya Vidyalaya Muzaffarpur is a school in Muzaffarpur, Muzaffarpur district in Bihar, India. It was established on 31 October 1986. It has two shifts. First shift has five sections for each class and offers science and commerce streams for classes 11th and 12th; second shifts has three and offers science and arts streams.

History
Kendriya Vidyalaya Muzaffarpur was established under the Department of Human Resource and Development, Government of India on 31 October 1986. The school building was inaugurated on 5 February 1997 by Mrs. Lizzie Jacob, the then commissioner of Kendriya Vidyalaya Sangathan, New Delhi.

Faculty 
The school has 133(both shift) well experienced teaching staff members, in three categories: post-graduate teachers (PGTs), trained graduate teachers (TGTs) and primary teachers (PRTs).

References

1986 establishments in Bihar
Educational institutions established in 1986
Kendriya Vidyalayas
Education in Muzaffarpur
High schools and secondary schools in Bihar
Government schools in India
Co-educational schools in India